Miloš Petrović may refer to:

 Miloš Petrović (composer), Serbian and Yugoslav musician and composer
 Miloš Petrović (footballer), Serbian football player